Dániel Völgyi (born 7 June 1987 in Szeged) is a Hungarian football player who currently plays for Swedish club Nyköpings BIS.

Career

Soroksár
On 29 August 2019, Völgyi announced on Facebook, that he had joined Soroksár SC.

References

External links
 

1987 births
Living people
Sportspeople from Szeged
Hungarian footballers
Association football midfielders
Tisza Volán SC footballers
Vasas SC players
Újpest FC players
Győri ETO FC players
Paksi FC players
Lombard-Pápa TFC footballers
Gyirmót FC Győr players
Debreceni VSC players
Soroksár SC players
Nemzeti Bajnokság I players
Nemzeti Bajnokság II players